Calanques National Park (French: Parc national des Calanques) is a French national park located on the Mediterranean coast in Bouches-du-Rhône, Southern France. It includes parts of the Massif des Calanques stretching between Marseille, Cassis and La Ciotat. Some of the park's best known features include the Calanque de Sormiou, Calanque de Morgiou, Calanque de Port-Miou, Calanque de Sugiton and Cosquer Cave.

History
In 1923, the Comité de défense des Calanques was established with the aim of preventing industry development at En-Vau. In 1999, the groupement d'intérêt public (GIP) des Calanques was founded to prepare the creation of a national park. Eleven years later, the GIP presented its first draft for a national park; the third draft was approved in 2011. On 18 April 2012, Prime Minister François Fillon signed the decree establishing Calanques National Park.

Gallery

References

External links 
Official website

National parks of France
Protected areas established in 2012
Northeastern Spain and Southern France Mediterranean forests